Berkshire Constabulary is a former Home Office police force which was responsible for policing the county  of Berkshire in Southern England. Berkshire Constabulary was merged with four other adjacent police forces in 1968 to form the Thames Valley Constabulary, later known as Thames Valley Police.

Formed in 1856, the Constabulary was headquartered near Forbury Gardens in Reading, until it moved in 1952 to Sulhamstead House (then called the "White House"), purchased by the Berkshire County Council five years earlier for £53,000. The house is currently the Thames Valley Police Training College and Thames Valley Police Museum.

Berkshire Constabulary subsumed several smaller police forces during its existence, including the Abingdon Borough Police, Maidenhead Borough Police, Newbury Borough Police, Wallingford Borough Police and Wantage Borough Police. The Windsor Borough Police remained an independent force until in 1947.

In 1965, Berkshire Constabulary had an establishment of 603 and an actual strength of 480.

On 1 April 1968 Thames Valley Constabulary was formed by amalgamating Berkshire Constabulary with Buckinghamshire Constabulary, the Oxford City Police, the Oxfordshire Constabulary and the Reading Borough Police.

Chief Constables
1856–1863 : Colonel James Fraser
1863–1902 : Colonel Adam Blandy
1902–1932 : Lieutenant-Colonel Arthur Faulconer Poulton
1932–1953 : Humphry Legge, 8th Earl of Dartmouth
1954–1958 : John Lovegrove Waldron
1958–1968 : Thomas Charles Birkett Hodgson (later Chief Constable of the Thames Valley Police)
1968 : Merged with other forces to form Thames Valley Police

See also
List of defunct law enforcement agencies in the United Kingdom

References

A pre-history of Thames Valley Police, Thames Valley Police

Defunct police forces of England
Constabulary
Constabulary
1856 establishments in England
1968 disestablishments in England